St. Xavier's Catholic College of Engineering is owned and managed by the  Most. Rev. Dr. Maria Williams, as the chairperson. It was established in 1998 by the Roman Catholic bishop of  Diocese of Kottar. It is located 5 km west of main town Nagercoil. The college is approved by the government of Tamil Nadu and is recognized by AICTE, New Delhi. The college is affiliated to Anna University.

The college is situated in a hillock at Chunkankadai in Kanyakumari District, overlooking the highway, NH 47. In June 2002, the institution was awarded the ISO 9001:2000 certificate by STQC certification services. The institution has been accredited by the National Assessment and Accreditation Council (NAAC) with 'A' Grade.All UG Programs of the institution are accredited by National Board of Accreditation (NBA) and all courses are permanently affiliated by Anna University, Chennai.

This is the first College in Kanyakumari District to get accredited by NAAC with A Grade and all UG Programs accredited by NBA.

This college becomes an Autuonomous Institution at 2022

This completes its Silver Jubliee year(25th year) at 2022

References

External links
 

Catholic universities and colleges in India
Private engineering colleges in Tamil Nadu
Colleges affiliated to Anna University
Universities and colleges in Kanyakumari district
Educational institutions established in 1998
1998 establishments in Tamil Nadu